Brad Sewell (born 2 February 1984) is a former Australian rules football player who played for the Hawthorn Football Club in the Australian Football League.

Early life
Sewell played junior football at the Newlyn Football Club which is part of the Central Highlands Football League and later with the North Ballarat Rebels in the U18 TAC Cup competition. Sewell attended Ballarat High School for his secondary education.

AFL career
Sewell was selected by the Hawthorn Football Club with the 7th overall pick in the 2003 Rookie Draft. 2006 proved to be his breakout year, when he was third in the club's Best and Fairest, collecting 130 votes behind Sam Mitchell and Luke Hodge. He played all 22 games for the season, and kicked his first and second goal in the last match of the year against Geelong.

In 2007, Sewell was a key player for Hawthorn as he went to win the Peter Crimmins Medal, winning by one vote over runner-up Campbell Brown.

On 27 September 2008, Sewell became a Premiership player, after the Hawks beat the reigning premiers Geelong in the Grand Final. Sewell was outstanding on this day coming 3rd overall in the Norm Smith medal voting.

In the final round of 2009, Sewell suffered a fractured cheekbone and eye socket when he was knocked out by a shirtfront from Essendon captain Matthew Lloyd early in the third quarter. This was the turning point in the match, as Hawthorn went on to lose the match and miss the finals after leading at the time of the incident. Lloyd later received a 6-week suspension (reduced to 4-weeks with guilty plea) for the hit; a month after the incident, Lloyd announced his retirement.

In September 2013, Sewell became a dual Premiership player when the Hawks defeated the Fremantle Football Club in the 2013 AFL Grand Final.

2014 was his final season, Sewell twice suffered from hamstring injuries. The first in the final practice match before the season began and then again in round 16, early in a game against . He managed ten games for the season with his last game being the Second Qualifying Final against .

Statistics

|- style=background:#EAEAEA
| 2003 ||  || 31
| 0 || — || — || — || — || — || — || — || — || — || — || — || — || — || — || 0
|-
| 2004 ||  || 28
| 6 || 0 || 0 || 27 || 31 || 58 || 13 || 17 || 0.0 || 0.0 || 4.5 || 5.2 || 9.7 || 2.2 || 2.8 || 0
|- style=background:#EAEAEA
| 2005 ||  || 28
| 12 || 0 || 1 || 76 || 81 || 157 || 35 || 15 || 0.0 || 0.1 || 6.3 || 6.8 || 13.1 || 2.9 || 1.3 || 0
|-
| 2006 ||  || 12
| 22 || 2 || 2 || 187 || 187 || 374 || 110 || 45 || 0.1 || 0.1 || 8.5 || 8.5 || 17.0 || 5.0 || 2.0 || 1
|- style=background:#EAEAEA
| 2007 ||  || 12
| 24 || 3 || 2 || 206 || 306 || 512 || 124 || 104 || 0.1 || 0.1 || 8.6 || 12.8 || 21.3 || 5.2 || 4.3 || 8
|-
| bgcolor=F0E68C | 2008# ||  || 12
| 21 || 7 || 8 || 188 || 305 || 493 || 100 || 99 || 0.3 || 0.4 || 9.0 || 14.5 || 23.5 || 4.8 || 4.7 || 16
|- style=background:#EAEAEA
| 2009 ||  || 12
| 19 || 4 || 3 || 209 || 281 || 490 || 83 || 124 || 0.2 || 0.2 || 11.0 || 14.8 || 25.8 || 4.4 || 6.5 || 13
|-
| 2010 ||  || 12
| 19 || 1 || 5 || 174 || 219 || 393 || 64 || 121 || 0.1 || 0.3 || 9.2 || 11.5 || 20.7 || 3.4 || 6.4 || 6
|- style=background:#EAEAEA
| 2011 ||  || 12
| 22 || 5 || 3 || 235 || 275 || 510 || 76 || 114 || 0.2 || 0.1 || 10.7 || 12.5 || 23.2 || 3.5 || 5.2 || 7
|-
| 2012 ||  || 12
| 24 || 4 || 13 || 309 || 300 || 609 || 59 || 127 || 0.2 || 0.5 || 12.9 || 12.5 || 25.4 || 2.5 || 5.3 || 13
|- style=background:#EAEAEA
| bgcolor=F0E68C | 2013# ||  || 12
| 21 || 2 || 6 || 215 || 221 || 436 || 51 || 103 || 0.1 || 0.3 || 10.2 || 10.5 || 20.8 || 2.4 || 4.9 || 3
|-
| 2014 ||  || 12
| 10 || 4 || 0 || 102 || 84 || 186 || 30 || 38 || 0.4 || 0.0 || 10.2 || 8.4 || 18.6 || 3.0 || 3.8 || 5
|- class="sortbottom"
! colspan=3| Career:
! 200 !! 32 !! 43 !! 1928 !! 2290 !! 4218 !! 745 !! 907 !! 0.2 !! 0.1 !! 9.6 !! 11.5 !! 21.1 !! 3.7 !! 4.5 !! 72
|}

Honours and achievements
Team
 2× AFL premiership player: 2008, 2013
 2× Minor premiership: 2012, 2013

Individual
 Peter Crimmins Medal: 2007
 Australia international rules football team: 2008
  life member
 Box Hill All-Star team (1999–2019)

Personal
Sewell's brother, Myles, won the J. J. Liston Trophy for North Ballarat in 2009. He also has two other siblings: brothers Adam, and sister Mikaela.

In 2011, Sewell completed a Bachelor of Commerce with a Sport Management Degree from Deakin University. In 2017, Sewell graduated from Monash University with a Master's in Business Administration.

In March 2016, Sewell, along with ex-teammate Michael Osborne, launched the Australian Rules Football College. Based in North Melbourne, and based on a US college model, the Australian Rules Football College focuses on developing the football skills of their students, whilst also placing an emphasis on education, through offering certificates in health, personal training, massage, leadership, management and diplomas in business.

Sewell is currently a commentator for Network 7, and occasionally plays for Newlyn in the Central Highlands Football League.

References

External links

 

1984 births
Australia international rules football team players
Australian rules footballers from Victoria (Australia)
Box Hill Football Club players
Deakin University alumni
Greater Western Victoria Rebels players
Hawthorn Football Club players
Hawthorn Football Club Premiership players
Living people
People educated at Ballarat High School
Peter Crimmins Medal winners
Two-time VFL/AFL Premiership players
Monash University alumni